Catherine Igathe, is a Kenyan business executive, who works as the managing director and chief executive officer of AIG Kenya Insurance Company Limited.

Background and education
She has a Bachelor of Science degree in Business Administration, awarded by United States International University Africa, in Nairobi. She then graduated from the Advanced Management Program of Strathmore Business School, also in Nairobi. She is also a graduate of the IESE Business School, in Spain.

Work experience
She has long-standing experience in the insurance industry going back nearly 25 years. At one time she served as the general manager in charge of distribution at AIG Kenya. Later, she was promoted to Acting Managing Director, serving in that capacity for six months, before she was confirmed as CEO.She is a former CEO at Jubilee General Insurance Kenya (now Jubilee Allianz General Insurance Ltd)

Other considerations
In 2016, Catherine Igathe was appointed as a non-executive director of Centum Investments, a Kenya-based publicly-traded investment company, whose stock is listed on the Nairobi Stock Exchange and on the Uganda Securities Exchange.

Family
She is married to Polycarp Igathe, and together are the parents of three children, one son and two daughters.

See also
 Polycarp Igathe
 Sauda Rajab
 Nelly Tuikong

References

External links
Website of AIG Kenya
Website of Centum Investments Limited

Living people
Year of birth missing (living people)
20th-century Kenyan businesswomen
20th-century Kenyan businesspeople
21st-century Kenyan businesswomen
21st-century Kenyan businesspeople
Kenyan chief executives
United States International University alumni
Strathmore University alumni